The 2014 Nippon Professional Baseball (NPB) Draft was held on October 23, for the 50th time at the Grand Prince Hotel Takanawa to assign amateur baseball players to the NPB. It was arranged with the special cooperation of Taisho Pharmaceutical Co. with official naming rights. The draft was officially called "The Professional Baseball Draft Meeting supported by Lipovitan D".

Summary 

As of the 2008 Draft, High School, University and Industrial League players could be selected at the same time whereas previous to 2008, separate drafts were held for each level of player.

As with the previous year, Taisho Pharmaceuticals was the special partner with naming rights. The Draft was named "The 2014 Professional Baseball Draft Meeting supported by Lipovitan D." Lipovitan D is one of Taisho's main brands.

Only the first round picks were allowed to be contested with all picks from the second round onward being based on table placing in the 2014 NPB season in a waiver system. From the third round the order was reversed continuing in the same fashion until all picks were exhausted. The Draft waiver priority was decided upon the winners of the 2014 NPB All-Stars game, but as the series ended 1-1 preference was based on point difference between the Central and Pacific Leagues where the former had a higher differential.

In total, 81 players were signed to professional contracts including 46 pitchers, 7 catchers, 17 infielders and 11 outfielders with 23 development players also signed.

First Round Contested Picks 

 Bolded teams indicate who won the right to negotiate contract following a lottery.
 In the first round, Kona Takahashi (pitcher) was selected by the Lions,  Ryosuke Nomura (pitcher) by the Dragons, Shogo Nakamura (Infielder) by the Marines,  Sachiya Yamasaki (pitcher) by the Buffaloes, Kazuma Okamoto (Infielder) by the Giants ,and Yuki Matsumoto (pitcher) by the Hawks in the first round without a bid lottery.
 In the second round, Shingo Takeshita (pitcher) was selected by the Swallows and Takayoshi Noma (Outfielder) by the Carp without a bid lottery.
 In the thrird round, the last remaining the Tigers, selected Yuya Yokoyama (pitcher).
 List of selected players.

Selected Players 

The order of the teams is the order of second round waiver priority.
 Bolded After that, a developmental player who contracted as a registered player under control.
 List of selected players.

Tokyo Yakult Swallows

Tohoku Rakuten Golden Eagles

Yokohama DeNA Baystars

Saitama Seibu Lions

Chunichi Dragons

Chiba Lotte Marines

Hiroshima Toyo Carp

Hokkaido Nippon-Ham Fighters

Hanshin Tigers

Orix Buffaloes

Yomiuri Giants

Fukuoka SoftBank Hawks

References

External links 
 プロ野球ドラフト会議 supported by リポビタンD - NPB.jp Nippon Professional Baseball

Nippon Professional Baseball draft
Draft
Nippon Professional Baseball draft
Nippon Professional Baseball draft
Baseball in Japan
Sport in Tokyo
Events in Tokyo